Steps (piano cycle series) is a set of large-scale piano works written by British composer Peter Seabourne (b.1960), currently standing at 10 volumes (196 pieces) of approximately 9 hours total duration. Each cycle is based around a theme and comprises a sequence of often poetically entitled movements.

The cycles

The first volume (2001-4) marked the composer's return to composition after a 12-year silence. Originally simply a series of standalone pieces, it was only subsequently gathered into an anthology. However, from the second volume onwards the works are conceived as integrated single spans in the manner of Janacek's On an Overgrown Path, or Schumann's Carnaval.

The Italian CD label Sheva has so far recorded volumes 1–5 with pianists Minjeong Shin, Giovanni Santini, Michael Bell, Fabio Menchetti and Alessandro Viale. Volume 6 was released in May 2022 by Konstantin Lifschitz on Willowhayne Records, and 7-10 are scheduled for recording during 2023-4. The CDs have been reviewed in Gramophone, BBC Music Magazine, Musical Opinion, International Piano, Piano News, Hudební rozhledy and many other magazines. Numerous live performances have taken place in Europe, Armenia, The United States of America and Japan, including by Alessandro Viale, Fabio Menchetti, Konstantin Lifschitz, Minjeong Shin, Michael Bell, Bethel Balge, Giuseppe Modugno, Haruko Seki, Chantal Balestri, Simone Rugani, Andrea Emanuele, Ettore Strangio, Giordano De Nisi, Emanuele Stracchi, Paolo Rinaldi, Barbara Panzarella, Giulia Grassi, Francesca Fierro, Isabella Gori, Letitia Amodio, Francesca Lauri, Sarah Vella, Daphne Delicata, Alvaro Siculiana, Julian Chan, Tsovinar Suflyan and Mikhail Shilyaev.

The composer's musical language is loosely tonal but is often stretched to include elements of polytonality, modality and free atonality. In Musical Opinion, Richard Whitehouse wrote of "a demonstrably Romantic rhetoric with an always audible and yet never facile approach to tonality". A striking feature throughout is the use of rhythm, described by one reviewer as "amazingly inventive" [of Volume 2]. This involves a widespread, subtle stretching of both individual beats and metre giving the music a feeling of flux and ongoing rubato.

Complete listing 

Volume 1: An anthology for piano (2001-4):

 Greeting!
 Still
 The Little White Girl
 El Suspiro del Moro
 Split The Lark...
 Suspended Journeys 
 I. 19
 II. Black
 III. A Touch
 Little Scene
 Over The Ocean
 Awake!
 The Sun - just touched the Morning!
 In Winter
 1. Im Windesweben
 2. An Baches Ranft
 3. Winter Landscape with Rocks
 4. Noch zwingt mich treue
 5. The Lark in Winter
 6. The Rose in Winter
 Trois Petits Adieux
 1. (Crotchet=76)
 2. Playful yet poignant
 3. Sombre

Volume 2: Studies of Invention (2007):
 Flying Machines
 Sixty Beggars
 Old Man with Water Studies
 Study of a Woman's Hands
 The Kite of the Cradle
 Tank
 Polishing Imperfections in Glass
 A Moth to the Light
 Perspectives of Disappearance
 La Scapigliata
 The Existence of Nothingness
 The Impossibility of Perpetual Motion
 Lenses for Looking at the Moon
 Study of a Deluge
 This is the Way Birds Descend

Volume 3: Arabesques (2012):

 1. The Bright Window
 2. Generalife - daybreak (I am the garden, revealed in beauty every morning)
 3. Melted silver, pearls, tears, clouds
 4. Dark Day
 5. Fountains
 6. Hamann Baths - blue secrets
 7. Mid-Afternoon -The Red Fort
 8. Water Gardens - the dark watchers - early evening
 9. Dream - domes of mocárabes

Volume 4: Libro di Canti Italiano (2011)

 Canto della Vita
 Domande
 Viaggio di Notte
 Piccolo Canto d'Amore Tremante
 Piccolo Canto delle Gocce di Pioggia
 Canto I miei Sogni
 Passi Sbagliati - Canzone Bacchica
 Canto della Ragazza da Toulouse
 Canto delle Farfalle
 Carillon Triste
 Canto d'Ammutinamento
 Notturno
 Canto Burbero
 Canto Lontano
 Anche gli Uccelli - Souvenir de Bertinoro
 Canto Oscuro
 Canto delle Foglie Cadenti
 Canzonetta in Stile Antico (omaggio da Robin Holloway)
 Canto Gioioso

Volume 5: Sixteen Scenes Before a Crucifixion (2014)

 no.1  
 no.2 
 no 3  
 no.4  
 no.5  
 no.6  
 no.7  
 no.8 
 no.9  
 no.10  
 no.11 
 no.12  
 no.13  
 no.14  
 no.15  
 no.16

Volume 6: Toccatas and Fantasias (2017)

 Toccata no.1
 Fantasia Lachryma
 Toccata no.2
 Fantasia Tragica
 Toccata no.3
 Fantasia Tenebrosa
 Toccata no.4
 Fantasia Meditativa
 Toccata no.5
 Fantasia Malinconica
 Toccata no.6
 Aria Sarabanda con variazioni

Volume 7: Dances on the Head of a Pin (2019)

 1. Spanish Sun Dance
 2. Sand Dance
 3. Galumph
 4. Musing Dance
 5. Uncertain Steps
 6. Doll's Dance
 7. River Dance
 8. Weaving Dance
 9. Minuet, or even a Sarabande
 10. Snake Dance
 11. One False Step
 12. Spiteful Dance
 13. How Still the Dancer Lies
 14. Dance of Death
 15. Lollop
 16. Un-Ravelling Dance
 17. Fall Down Seven Times, Get Up Eight!
 18. Impatient Mazurka
 19. Pas des Deux: L'Ancien et la Jeune Danseuse
 20. First Attempts at a Pirhouette
 21. The Lead Dancer Shows his Mettle
 22. Three Legs
 23. Pavan for a Revived Princess
 24. Danse Françaix?
 25. Bacchanalian Whirl
 26. Slow Movement
 27. The Amazing Dance of the Peacock Spider
 28. Tread Softly...
 29. Stamping Dance
 30. Helter Skelter
 31. Hop of Hope - with Harp
 32. Carefully, Carefully! Slow Sword Dance
 33. Snap Shot - Ecossaise
 34. With How Sad Steps
 35. Hobble
 36. Unreel
 37. Before a Tarantella
 38. Tarantella

Volume 8: My Song in October (2021)

 1. Komorebi
 2. How beautifully it falls
 3. At the fall of the leaf
 4. When the leaves are flying
 5. This leaf
 6. When the rose is dead
 7. The drifting leaf
 8. One by one
 9. On the wings of the breeze
 10. The leaves are falling
 11. Oh, lift me as a wave, a leaf, a cloud!
 12. As a dead leaf
 13. The wind scatters the golden leaves!
 14. Every breath
 15. Listen...
 16. After Autumn, Winter
 17. The wind whispers in dry leaves
 18. This sprig of heather
 19. Who'll toll the bell?

Volume 9: Les Fleurs de la Maladie (2021)

 An Empty Bench - My Garden (1881)
 Snowdrops (now is the globe shrunk tight)
 Imagined Bouquet from Berthe Morisot
 Helleborus Foetidus (hope in winter)
 Imagined Bouquet from Suzanne Manet
 Tulips (the flame)
 Imagined Bouquet from Antonin Proust
 Dandelions in flower and in seed (any way the wind blows)
 Imagined Bouquet from Stéphane Mallarmé
 Delphinium (nothing can restrain this heart)
 Imagined Bouquet from Victorine Meurent
 Lilies on a Windowsill (outside-in)
 Imagined Bouquet from Charles Baudelaire
 Rosa Glauca (departures)
 Imagined Bouquet from Émmanuel Chabrier
 Marigolds on a blue chair (last summer)
 Imagined Bouquet from Méry Laurent
 An Empty Chair - My Garden (2020)

Volume 10: In a Grain of Sand (2023)

 1. I look through you at the sun
 2. You ignite your own fire
 3. Reverberate through hidden mossy chambers
 4. Long stony corridors and marine gems
 5. Patiently rethinking the world
 6. Dissolving like honey on God's tongue
 7. With a nonchalant gesture you put to my eye
 8. A lens of magnificent refractions
 9. To my ear, a curious sound
 10. First, a rumbling, then, surrender
 11. At last, the beatific moment when you fly in the air
 12. With a stellar whoosh…
 13. A wonder that does not know of itself
 14. As all marvels are, innocent
 15. Of aggrandizing and human drama
 16. Spending of itself inexhaustibly
 17. In prisms of glory and enigmatic hexagons
 18. A grain of sand is a sun
 19. Much closer to us than any other revelation planets.
---
 20. A letter full of breaths has arrived
 21. A nameless sender's courtesy to me
 22. The hand is puzzling, grains of sand
 23. Pour in the heart, and plunge in opened earth
 24. Time is passing without progressing
 25. The sundial memorializes someone's joy in a return
 26. Stunned language of silence, unvoiced throat,
 27. Pigments of longing infuse our reunions
 28. Who has been calling all night
 29. In the realm of air and water?
 30. Watching with eyes of wild birds
 31. Breathing with lungs of tuft and grasses?
 32. Shall I call you a Shadow?
 33. Lithe body of quiet revolt
 34. Your sleeves are as light as sails
 35. Quickening a boat towards darkness
 36. The river of love and death is ready to swallow
 37. Our pleasure trips into what caused us pain
 38. A silver fish's splash submerges in a last lingering chord.

References

External links
 Composer's website
 YouTube playlist from commercial recordings of volumes 1-5

Compositions for solo piano